Galiniai is a village in the region of Suvalkija, Lithuania, near the border with Poland.

References

Villages in Marijampolė County